The University of North Texas Discovery Park Campus, formerly Research Park, is a satellite research facility of the University of North Texas. Discovery Park is located in  Denton, Texas, north of the main campus, on U.S. Highway 77. In January 2004, the  facility, formerly occupied by Texas Instruments, opened to students from the UNT College of Engineering. In 2008, the newly formed College of Information joined the Discovery Park campus. The facility houses offices and labs for the Departments of Engineering Technology, Computer Science and Engineering, Materials Science and Engineering, Electrical Engineering, Mechanical and Energy Engineering, Information Science, Learning Technologies, and Linguistics. The Center for Technology Development and Transfer (CTDT) began operations from Discovery Park in 2006.

The University of North Texas Discovery Park Library serves the Discovery Park Campus as a satellite branch of the UNT Library system. Cross country running meets are held at the facility.

The Discovery Park Campus is located at 3940 North Elm Street, Denton, TX 76207.

References

External links 
 UNT Department of Computer Science and Engineering
 UNT Department of Electrical Engineering
 UNT Department of Engineering Technology
 UNT Department of Materials Science and Engineering
 UNT Department of Mechanical and Energy Engineering
 UNT Department of Information Science
 UNT Department of Learning Technologies
 UNT Department of Linguistics

University of North Texas
Science parks in the United States
Buildings and structures in Denton, Texas
Cross country running courses in Texas
Facilities